John Swihart is an American musical composer for film and television. He is perhaps best known for his score to Napoleon Dynamite, Youth in Revolt, Employee of the Month, and his music for the TV shows How I Met Your Mother, and Go On.

John Swihart was raised in Bloomington, Indiana, the son of a physicist based at Indiana University. He spent a portion of his formative years in Europe and Asia, where his father would sabbatical.

John had some musical training at a very young age but was not deeply absorbed by music until he was about eight. Swihart would leave Indiana to attend Berklee College of Music, in Boston. He graduated in 1986.

Swihart played Chapman Stick, Bass, Guitar and Zither in the Boston, New York and Las Vegas Blue Man Group shows, on his way to Los Angeles.
His breakout film project Napoleon Dynamite premiered at the Sundance Film Festival in 2004.

Works

Films

2000s

2010s

2020s

Television series

Video game

Awards and nominations

Golden Satellite Award (2004) for best original score (Napoleon Dynamite)
Grammy Nomination (2006) for best compilation soundtrack album for motion picture, television or other visual media (Napoleon Dynamite)

References

External links

Living people
American film score composers
American television composers
Berklee College of Music alumni
American male film score composers
Male television composers
Musicians from Bloomington, Indiana
Year of birth missing (living people)